New Skin for the Old Ceremony is the fourth studio album by Leonard Cohen, released in 1974. On this album, he begins to evolve away from the rawer sound of his earlier albums, with violas, mandolins, banjos, guitars, percussion and other instruments giving the album a more orchestrated (but nevertheless spare) sound. The album is silver in the UK, but never entered the Billboard Top 200.

A remastered CD was released in 1995, and in 2009 it was included in Hallelujah – The Essential Leonard Cohen Album Collection, an 8-CD box set issued by Sony Music in the Netherlands.

Cover 
The original cover art for New Skin for the Old Ceremony was an image from the alchemical text Rosarium philosophorum. The two winged and crowned beings in sexual embrace caused his U.S. record label, Columbia Records, to print one early edition of the album minus the image substituting instead a photo of Cohen. Another early manifestation of the cover art saw an additional angel wing collage added to cover the depicted figures, presumably to render the image more "decent".

The image originally came to public attention in C. G. Jung's essay The Psychology of the Transference, where it is held by Jung to depict the union of psychic opposites in the consciousness of the enlightened saint. The sexual embrace as a symbol for this condition of psychic unity is also found frequently in Tibetan thangkas (sacred paintings).

Track listing 
All songs written by Leonard Cohen.

Side one

 "Is This What You Wanted" – 4:13
 "Chelsea Hotel #2" – 3:06
 "Lover Lover Lover" – 3:19
 "Field Commander Cohen" – 3:59
 "Why Don't You Try" – 3:50

Side two

 "There Is a War" – 2:59
 "A Singer Must Die" – 3:17
 "I Tried to Leave You" – 2:40
 "Who by Fire" – 2:33
 "Take This Longing" – 4:06
 "Leaving Green Sleeves" – 2:38

Songs 
"Chelsea Hotel", the precursor to "Chelsea Hotel #2", was only performed live and co-written by Cohen and his guitarist Ron Cornelius. "Chelsea Hotel #2" refers to a sexual encounter in the Chelsea Hotel, probably New York City's most famous Bohemian hostelry. For some years, when performing this song live, Cohen would tell a story that made it clear that the person about whom he was singing was Janis Joplin. Cohen would eventually come to regret his choice to make people aware that the song was about Joplin, and the graphic detail in which the song describes their brief relationship. In a 1994 broadcast on the BBC, Cohen said it was "an indiscretion for which I'm very sorry, and if there is some way of apologising to the ghost, I want to apologise now, for having committed that indiscretion." 

In concert, a prolonged "I Tried to Leave You" was sometimes used to introduce the band. The 14-minute rendition from the 1985 Montreux Jazz Festival even featured extra lines given to the backup singers.

"Who by Fire" explicitly relates to Cohen's Jewish roots, echoing the words of the Unetanneh Tokef prayer and sung as a duet with Janis Ian (also Jewish; her birth name is Janis Eddy Fink). 

"Leaving Green Sleeves" is a reworking of the 15th-century folk song "Greensleeves". Cohen retains the chord progression and the words of the first two verses, but changes the melody and takes the latter verses in a different direction than the original. The song, and in turn the album, ends with Cohen violently screaming the chorus as the track fades out.

On December 16, 2010, the Hammer Museum in Los Angeles showcased a series of eleven commissioned art videos inspired by songs from New Skin for the Old Ceremony. The project was curated by Lorca Cohen and Darin Klein. The artists participating in the project were Brent Green, Alex da Corte, Wenston Currie, Theo Angell, Christian Holstad, Sylvan and Lily Lanken, "Lucky Dragons," Kelly Sears, Brett Milspaw, Peter Coffin, and Tina Tyrell. On April 14, 2011, the program screened at the Museum of Modern Art in New York.

Personnel 
 Leonard Cohen – guitar, vocals, producer
 Ralph Gibson – guitar
 Jeff Layton – banjo, mandolin, guitar, trumpet
 John Miller – bass
 Don Payne – bass
 Lewis Furey – viola
 John Lissauer – woodwinds, keyboards, backing vocals, producer, arranger
 Gerald Chamberlain – trombones
 Janis Ian – vocals
 Emily Bindiger – backing vocals
 Erin Dickins – backing vocals
 Gail Kantor – backing vocals
 Roy Markowitz – drums
 Armen Halburian – percussion

Songs for Rebecca 
Shortly after this album, co-producers Lissauer and Cohen proceeded to work on its follow-up, Songs For Rebecca, which was abandoned after one side was completed. Five songs are known from their live performances during the North American tour of November 1975; they were reworked and recorded few years later – two of them with Phil Spector for Death of a Ladies' Man in 1977, and the other three on Recent Songs in 1979.

Cover versions 

"Chelsea Hotel #2" has been performed many times by other musicians.  Lloyd Cole covered it on the Cohen tribute album I'm Your Fan, and Rufus Wainwright performed the song at the 2006 live tribute, Leonard Cohen: I'm Your Man. Regina Spektor has also covered the song in live performances, as has Lambchop and the song features on their tour only album Rainer on my Parade.  Marissa Nadler covered "Chelsea Hotel #2" on her Australian Tour CD and has been known to cover this song in her live performances.  It was covered by Brand New, sung by band leader Jesse Lacey. Kevin Devine has also covered it on his She Stayed as Steam EP. Meshell Ndegeocello covered it during a concert in Paris, France on 30 January 2011. A cover version by American singer Lana Del Rey was posted to her own YouTube page in 2013. It is also referenced in both the title and lyrics of Jeffrey Lewis's song "The Chelsea Hotel Oral Sex Song."

"A Singer Must Die" was covered by the Irish art rock group The Fatima Mansions on I'm Your Fan, by Jennifer Warnes on her 1986 album Famous Blue Raincoat, and by the Art of Time Ensemble featuring (former Barenaked Ladies singer) Steven Page (a Gavin Bryars arrangement) on their 2010 album A Singer Must Die.

"Who by Fire" was covered by The House of Love on I'm Your Fan, by industrial band Coil on their 1986 album Horse Rotorvator, and by Buck 65 and Jenn Grant on Buck 65's 2011 album 20 Odd Years. It also appears on the fifth solo album released by the Canadian singer Patricia O'Callaghan in 2011, Matador: The Songs of Leonard Cohen. PJ Harvey covered this song in the opening credits of the 2022 Apple TV+ series Bad Sisters.

"Lover Lover Lover" was covered by Ian McCulloch of Echo and the Bunnymen, scoring him a minor hit in the British charts in 1992.

"I Tried to Leave You" was covered by Lera Lynn on Have You Met Lera Lynn? in 2014.

The Menzingers released "Sun Hotel #2" which is based heavily on the original track on On The Possible Past, a collection of demos recorded for their 2012 album On The Impossible Past which in turn featured a reworking called "Sun Hotel".

The band Phish covered "Is This What You Wanted" at their concert on October 31, 2014 as an encore.

Spanish folk singer Joaquín Sabina covered "There is a War" (Spanish title: "Pie de Guerra") in his 2005 album Alivio de Luto, with translated lyrics.

The English supergroup The Last Shadow Puppets covered "Is This What You Wanted" on their 2016 sophomore album Everything You've Come to Expect.

Charts

Weekly charts

Year-end charts

Certifications and sales

Notes

External links 
 Album lyrics, from The Leonard Cohen Files

1974 albums
Leonard Cohen albums
Columbia Records albums
Albums produced by John Lissauer